Iesada (written: 家定) is a masculine Japanese given name. Notable people with the name include:

 (1543–1608), Japanese samurai and daimyō
 (1824–1858), Japanese shōgun

Japanese masculine given names